A furlong is a unit of measurement equal to one-eighth of a mile.

Furlong may also refer to:

Furlong (surname), a list of individuals with the surname
Furlong, Pennsylvania, a village in Doylestown Township

See also

 North Furlong Lake (Nevada)
 The Last Furlong
 Village of Columbus and Camp Furlong